

Municipal Mayors of Ilocos Norte
Ilocos Norte comprises 21 municipalities and 2 component cities, further subdivided into 557 barangays. There are two legislative districts in the province.

References 

 http://www.comelec.gov.ph/?r=2016NLE/ElectionResults
 https://web.archive.org/web/20160603212601/https://www.pilipinaselectionresults2016.com/

Mayors of places in Ilocos Norte